Christopher Richard Jones  better known by his stage name Jonezen, is an American rapper, songwriter, actor and guitarist. Born in Detroit, Michigan, he now resides in Los Angeles, CA.

Career
Jonezen started his career in 2005 with the rap group Outta Control until 2011 then he left the group starting a solo career and recorded his first mixtape Live From Rehab. Jonezen signed by Charve The Don to Concore Entertainment in 2014.

Jonezen received coverage in The Source Magazine, AllHipHop.com and Hip Hop Since 1987 who asked Jonezen “is he the next Eminem? Or Can Jonezen be the next Eminem?” winning 2013 
Los Angeles Music Awards for Hip Hop Artist of the year and winning 2014 Los Angeles Music Awards for Hip Hop Artist and Solo Performer of the Year, and his single "Tear The Club Up ft. Natalia Damini & Gucci Mane" has been added on Sirius XM Hip Hop Nation. Jonezen was booked for the Monster Energy/Soundrink presented "Get Loud" tour with Bone Thugs N' Harmony and hit the road in November 2014. He also has toured California multiple times, performed at the 2013 South By Southwest music festival, booked at the 2014 South By Southwest Music Fest, licensed songs for use in TV and film, had a small role performing his original material in the new Jamie Kennedy film Buddy Hutchins, been a featured guest on the Janice Dickinson talk show, and participated in the P.A.C.E. school tour. In 2015 Jonezen released the mixtape The Party Ain't Over.

Discography

Singles

Tours
2014 - "Get Loud Tour" Bone Thugs-n-Harmony

Music videos

Awards

Underground Music Awards
2015
#1 Contender

Los Angeles Music Awards
2013
Hip Hop Artist Of The Year

2014
Hip Hop Artist Of The Year
Solo Performer

References

External links
 

1984 births
American male rappers
Rappers from Detroit
Living people
21st-century American rappers
21st-century American male musicians